I Am Not Lorena, (Spanish: No Soy Lorena) is a 2014 Chilean film directed by Isidora Marras, written by Isidora Marras and Catalina Calcagni and produced by Josefina Undurraga and Gregorio González Nicolini. Filmed in Chile, I am not Lorena is a drama/thriller and is Isidora Marras' debut feature film.

Plot 
The story revolves around Olivia, a late twenties actress who has recently ended her relationship with Mauro, a theatre director. Despite their breakup, Olivia agrees to act in a play directed by Mauro. However, things do not go well for her in either her personal life or the play where she struggles to meet Mauro's demanding expectations.

To make matters worse, Olivia begins receiving an increasing number of harassing phone calls. She is mistaken for Lorena Ruiz, a woman with numerous debts, and her creditors refuse to believe they have the wrong person. The harassment persists, and Olivia's case of mistaken identity becomes a Kafkaesque nightmare as she searches for the mysterious Lorena Ruiz.

The film's director, Isidora Marras, was inspired by her own experience of mistaken identity. The movie portrays a bureaucratic and dehumanized system where people are reduced to mere consumers.

Cast 
Loreto Aravena
Paulina García (Gloria)
Gabriela Aguilera (The Motorcycle Diaries, Violeta Went to Heaven)
Matías Oviedo
Elisa Zulueta
Etienne Bobenrieth

Release and Reception 
The film was released on 5 September 2014 (Canada) Toronto International Film Festival, 22 October 2014 (Chile) SANFIC Film Festival, 10 November 2014 (Sweden) Stockholm International Film Festival

The film got mixed reception, reviews tend to point the inexperience of the director Isidora Marras, and how secondary characters steal the spotlight. Paulina García (Gloria)) for example as some reviews pointed.

References

External links
 

Films shot in Chile
2014 films
Spanish drama films
American drama films
2010s Spanish-language films
Films about actors
Films about immigration
Films set in Chile
Chilean drama films
2014 drama films
2010s American films